Alvarado is a station on Line 1 of the Madrid Metro which opened on 3 June 1929. It is located in Zone A.

References 

Line 1 (Madrid Metro) stations
Railway stations in Spain opened in 1929